Hamza Younés (born 16 April 1986) is a Tunisian professional footballer who plays as a striker.

After starting out at Sfaxien in his native country, Younés went on to compete in Romania, Bulgaria, Iran, Greece, Turkey and Qatar. Internationally, he amassed eleven caps for Tunisia between 2014 and 2017.

Club career
In August 2011, a few hours before the transfer deadline, Younés was brought to Étoile du Sahel, in an attempt to replace Ahmed Akaïchi. He later signed a three-year contract with the team. On 14 November 2011, Younés left Étoile.

In February 2012, after Hamza's unsuccessful transfer to Astra Giurgiu because of contractual misunderstandings, he scored a move to fellow Liga 1 team Petrolul Ploieşti. He made an immediate impact with the team, scoring 12 times in his first six months with the "Yellow Wolves". In the 2012–13 Liga 1 season he played 28 games and scored 13 goals, he also won the Romanian Cup playing in 4 games.

On 28 January 2014, Younés signed with Bulgarian club Botev Plovdiv on a three-year deal for an undisclosed fee. On his debut that took place on 23 February, he scored twice in the 2–2 draw with Ludogorets Razgrad, putting in a MOTM performance and was subsequently recognized as the best performer of the round.

In August 2014, Younés put pen to paper on a contract with Ludogorets Razgrad. He scored his first goal for the club in the 3–1 win over his former club, Botev Plovdiv, in the Bulgarian Supercup final. Younés made his debut in UEFA Champions League group stages in the 2–1 loss to Liverpool, providing an assist for Daniel Abalo's equalizer.

He joined Persian Gulf Pro League club Tractor SC in summer of 2015. On 30 July 2015, Younés made his debut for Tractor SC against Naft Tehran. He scored his first goal on 20 September 2015 in a 1–0 Hazfi Cup victory against Saba Qom.

On 4 July 2016, Younés signed with Greek Superleague club Xanthi on a year deal for an undisclosed fee. He finished the season as the second top scorer of the league after the Swedish striker Marcus Berg.

Aris
On 20 July 2018, after a year playing with BB Erzurumspor and Al Ahli, Younés has agreed to return to Greek Super League and sign contract until the summer of 2020 with Aris. On 2 September 2018, the Tunisian striker received a high cross from Manolis Tzanakakis and tapped it in with his chest, thus scoring his first goal for the season and opening the score in a 2–0 home win against AEL. On 17 September 2018, he opened the score with a penalty in a 2–0 home win against Levadiakos. On 30 September 2018, he scored in a 2-0 home win against Asteras Tripoli, successfully converting a penalty won by Mateo García. On 25 November 2018, Hamza Younés scored twice in added time as an astonishing finish matchday clash against OFI ended in a superb 2-1 win for the Salonica club at the Theodoros Vardinogiannis Stadium. One week later, he opened the scored with a penalty kick in an eventual 1-1 home draw against Panathinaikos.

On 18 March 2019, Hamza came in as a substitute and scored in an emphatic 5-0 home win against Apollon Smyrnis, returning to goals after three-and-a-half months. On 22 April 2019, his goal helped the team to a 2-1 away win against Panetolikos. On 5 May 2019, in the last matchday of the season, he was the undisputed MVP of an astounding 7-2 home win against Xanthi, scoring 1 goal and providing his teammates with 2 assists.

Petrolul Ploiești
On 9 September 2019 Younés signed a contract with Petrolul Ploiești.

International career
On 28 May 2014, he made his debut for Tunisia, playing in the last 4 minutes of a 1–0 friendly win against South Korea. His second cap came in a 0–1 friendly loss to Belgium.

International stats

Personal life
Hamza married a Romanian woman in Ploiești in 2016, with whom he has a child.

Career statistics

Club

Honours

Club
CS Sfaxien
Tunisian Cup: 2008–09
CAF Confederation Cup: 2007, 2008
North African Cup Winners Cup: 2009

Petrolul Ploiești
Cupa României: 2012–13

Ludogorets Razgrad
Bulgarian A Group : 2014–15
Bulgarian Supercup: 2014

References

External links

1986 births
Living people
Tunisian footballers
Association football forwards
CS Sfaxien players
Étoile Sportive du Sahel players
FC Petrolul Ploiești players
Botev Plovdiv players
PFC Ludogorets Razgrad players
Tractor S.C. players
Al Ahli SC (Doha) players
Aris Thessaloniki F.C. players
Xanthi F.C. players
Athlitiki Enosi Larissa F.C. players
Liga I players
Liga  II players
Qatar Stars League players
Persian Gulf Pro League players
Super League Greece players
TFF First League players
2011 African Nations Championship players
People from Monastir Governorate
2015 Africa Cup of Nations players
Tunisian expatriate footballers
Expatriate footballers in Romania
Tunisian expatriate sportspeople in Romania
Expatriate footballers in Belgium
Tunisian expatriate sportspeople in Belgium
Expatriate footballers in Bulgaria
Tunisian expatriate sportspeople in Bulgaria
Expatriate footballers in Iran
Tunisian expatriate sportspeople in Iran
Expatriate footballers in Greece
Tunisian expatriate sportspeople in Greece
Expatriate footballers in Turkey
Tunisia international footballers
Tunisia A' international footballers